The 1911 Cisleithanian legislative election was held in the Kingdom of Dalmatia in eleven single-seat constituencies by universal male suffrage.

Results

Elected lists and candidates 

Elections in Croatia
1911 elections in Europe
1911 in Croatia
Cisleithanian legislative elections
History of Dalmatia